Petite Galerie was a short-lived alternative art gallery in Lleida, Catalonia, Spain. It existed between 1968 and 1974, during the last years of the Francoist dictatorship, and was especially relevant for being the first of its kind in Catalonia, offering exhibitions of avantgarde art. It was opened as a collaboration between the local branch of Alliance Française, directed by Jaume Magre, and painters Àngel Jové and Albert Coma Estadella. The Barcelona-born artist Antoni Llena debuted there.

In 2009, the Sala Coma Estadella, a gallery in Lleida, showcased a retrospective about La Petite Gallery and Coma Estadella's works.

See also
 Culture of Lleida
 Petite Galerie of the Louvre

References

External links
Book reference for Marta Pallarés i Roqué's book La Petite Galerie 1968-1976, una galeria d'art alternatiu a Lleida

Defunct art museums and galleries
Culture in Lleida
Art museums and galleries in Catalonia
Art galleries established in 1968
Art galleries disestablished in 1974
1968 establishments in Spain
1974 disestablishments in Spain